Jean Tedesco (1895–1958) was a French film director, film critic and screenwriter. Chief editor of the Cinéa magazine he also was managing director of the théâtre du Vieux-Colombier between 1924 and 1934 where he showed avant-garde films during the 1920s.

Filmography (selection) 
 1951 : Napoléon Bonaparte, empereur des Français (documentary)
 1951 : L'Anglais tel qu'on le parle (after Tristan Bernard) (short film)
 1951  :  (short)
 1948 :  with Charles Dechamps
 1946 : Comédie avant Molière  (short)
 1945 :  (short)
 1943 :  (documentary)
 1941 : Sur les chemins de Lamartine (documentary)
 1937 : Panoramas au fil de l'eau
 1931 : Amour et quadrille
 1928 : The Little Match Girl (co director : Jean Renoir)

Bibliography 
 Le Cinéma, Jean Tédesco, 1933

References

External links 

 Cinema-francais.fr
 Cineressources.net
 

French film directors
French film critics
20th-century French screenwriters
Film directors from London
1895 births
1959 deaths